The 1928 United States presidential election in Virginia took place on November 6, 1928. Voters chose 12 representatives, or electors to the Electoral College, who voted for president and vice president.

Virginia voted for the Republican nominee, former United States Secretary of Commerce Herbert Hoover, over the Democratic nominee, New York Governor Al Smith. Hoover ultimately carried the state with 53.91% of the vote. This was only the second election that Virginia had voted for a Republican candidate, the first being in 1872 during the Reconstruction era.

Results

Results by county

References

Virginia
1928
1928 Virginia elections